Friend, Our Legend is a 2009 South Korean television series starring Hyun Bin, Kim Min-jun, Seo Do-young, Lee Si-eon and Wang Ji-hye. It aired on MBC from June 27 to August 30, 2009 on Saturdays and Sundays at 22:40 for 20 episodes.

It is a remake/TV adaptation of Kwak Kyung-taek's own 2001 box-office hit film Friend. Partnering up with another director and two scriptwriters, Kwak returned to the classic tale of male bonding, adding "more meat," in his words, to the original plot by writing a new character and more in-depth exploration of certain characters' lives, including their romances. Like the original film, the series was shot entirely in Busan. To maintain quality, it was 100% pre-produced before airing, a rarity among Korean dramas.

Plot
Based on the 2001 film, Friend, Our Legend expands and retells Kwak Kyung-taek's semi-autobiographical rough-and-tumble tale about four childhood friends coming of age in the tough streets of Busan in the 1970s and 1980s. As they enter into manhood, best friends Dong-soo and Joon-seok become enemies and bitter rivals in the city's underworld of gangs.

Cast

Main characters
 Hyun Bin as Han Dong-soo 
 Kim Min-jun as Lee Joon-seok
 Seo Do-young as Jung Sang-taek
 Lee Si-eon as Kim Joong-ho
 Wang Ji-hye as Choi Jin-sook
 Moon Ga-young as young Jin-sook
 Bae Geu-rin as Park Sung-ae
 Jeong Yu-mi as Min Eun-ji

Supporting characters
 Jung Hye-sung as Sae-ri
 Oh Min-ae as Jin-sook's mother
 Kim Dong-hyun as Joon-seok's father
 Lee Jae-yong as Sang-gon, gangster boss
 Cha Do-jin as "Doruko"
 Choo Min-ki as Joong-ki
 Kim Rok-kyung as "Kangaroo"
 Kim Ri-na as Do-yeon
 Kwon Jae-hyun as umbrella man
 Seo Gil-ja as loan shark
 Kim Jong-soo as Dong-soo's father
 Kim Yoon-sung as "Hyena"
 Noh Jun-ho
 Joo Ah
 Go In-beom
 Lee Sol-gu as Seom Pyo-joo
 Kwak Min-suk

Notes

References

External links
Friend, Our Legend official MBC website 
Friend, Our Legend Japanese website 

2009 South Korean television series debuts
2009 South Korean television series endings
MBC TV television dramas
South Korean action television series
Television shows set in Busan